Heatherdown School, formally called Heatherdown Preparatory School, was an independent preparatory school for boys, near Ascot, in the English county of Berkshire.

The school was a leading "feeder school" for Eton College.

Heatherlea
During their first year at the school, boys attended classes in the main school building but at night returned to Heatherlea, a small house set back from the London Road near the Royal Foresters Hotel. Heatherlea typically had around eight boys and two matrons.

Railway
The school had its own miniature steam railway that ran around a substantial area of the grounds. It was set up by Henry May, who ran a garage in Ascot. The railway was used by enthusiasts from outside the school, although boys were regularly recruited as passengers and spectators. The railway had one station, a halt, a tunnel and a turntable.

Notable former pupils

The school's pupils included:
Prince Andrew, Duke of York
Prince Edward, Duke of Edinburgh
Andrew Russell, 15th Duke of Bedford
David Cameron, former Prime Minister of the United Kingdom
David Cholmondeley, 7th Marquess of Cholmondeley
Alexander Cockburn, writer
Sir Edward Fielden, pilot and Second World War hero
Giles Goschen, 4th Viscount Goschen
Bryan Guinness, 2nd Baron Moyne
Victor Hely-Hutchinson
George Mountbatten, 4th Marquess of Milford Haven
Lord Ivar Mountbatten
David Niven, actor
William Legge, 10th Earl of Dartmouth
Angus Ogilvy
James Ogilvy
John Eric Drummond, 9th Earl of Perth
Oliver Shepard
David Carnegie, 4th Duke of Fife
George Windsor, Earl of St Andrews
King Jigme Singye Wangchuck, 4th King of Bhutan

According to Francis Elliot and James Hanning's biography of David Cameron, the school was renowned for its academic and sporting excellence.

Closure
The last Headmaster of the School was James V. Edwards. After closing in 1982 for financial difficulty, the buildings were bought by the Licensed Victuallers, in order to set up a junior school. The buildings were eventually demolished in 1989 at which point the site was redeveloped to house both the LVS junior school and the senior school, which moved to Ascot from its previous location in Slough.

See also
 List of boys' schools in the United Kingdom
 Licensed Victuallers' School, now on the school site

References 

History of Berkshire
Defunct schools in Bracknell Forest
Educational institutions disestablished in 1982
1982 disestablishments in England
Demolished buildings and structures in England
Buildings and structures demolished in 1989
Winkfield